Taapsee Pannu is an Indian actress who works in Hindi, Telugu and Tamil language films.

Filmography

Television

Short films

References

Actress filmographies
Indian filmographies